The Medal for Environmental and Safety Technologies was established by the Institute of Electrical and Electronics Engineers (IEEE) Board of Directors in 2008.  This award is presented for outstanding accomplishments in the application of technology in the fields of interest to IEEE that improve the environment and/or public safety.  The medal is sponsored by Toyota Corporation.

The award may be presented to an individual or a team of up to three people.

Recipients of this award receive a gold medal, a bronze replica, a certificate and an honorarium.

The award was presented for the first time in 2010.

Basis for Judging: In the evaluation process, the following criteria are considered: public benefits of the contribution; degree in improvement in important performance metrics; innovative design, development, or application engineering; favorable influence on the contribution on technical professions.

Nomination deadline: 1 July

Notification: Recipients are typically approved during the November IEEE Board of Directors meeting. Recipients and their nominators will be notified following the meeting. Then the nominators of unsuccessful candidates will be notified of the status of their nomination.

Presentation: At the annual IEEE Honors Ceremony

Recipients

References

Environmental and Safety Technologies
Environmental technology